Charles Edward Maplestone (13 May 1876 – 12 November 1937) was an Australian rules footballer who played with Carlton in the Victorian Football League (VFL).

Notes

External links 
		
Charlie Maplestone's profile at Blueseum

1876 births
1937 deaths
Australian rules footballers from Victoria (Australia)
Australian Rules footballers: place kick exponents
Carlton Football Club players